John Peter Johanson (January 22, 1865 – December 14, 1937) was a sailor serving in the United States Navy during the Spanish–American War who received the Medal of Honor for bravery.

Biography
Johanson was born January 22, 1865,  in Sweden and after entering the navy was sent to fight in the Spanish–American War aboard the U.S.S. Marblehead as a seaman.

On May 11, 1898,  the Marblehead was given the task of cutting the cable leading from Cienfuegos, Cuba. During the operation and facing heavy enemy fire, he continued to perform his duties throughout this action.

He died December 14, 1937, and was buried at Arlington National Cemetery, Arlington, Virginia.

Medal of Honor citation
Rank and organization: Seaman, U.S. Navy. Born: 22 January 1865, Sweden. Accredited to: Maryland. G.O. No.: 529, 21 November 1899.

Citation:

On board the U.S.S. Marblehead during the operation of cutting the cable leading from Cienfuegos, Cuba, 11 May 1898. Facing the heavy fire of the enemy, Johanson set an example of extraordinary bravery and coolness throughout this action.

See also

 List of Medal of Honor recipients for the Spanish–American War

References

External links
 
  John P. Johanson at ArlingtonCemetery.net, an unofficial website John P. Johanson] at ArlingtonCemetery.net, an unofficial website

1865 births
1937 deaths
United States Navy Medal of Honor recipients
United States Navy sailors
American military personnel of the Spanish–American War
United States Navy personnel of World War I
Swedish emigrants to the United States
Foreign-born Medal of Honor recipients
Burials at Arlington National Cemetery
Spanish–American War recipients of the Medal of Honor